Johann Gottlieb Siegel (25 April 1699 - 1755) was a German legal scholar.

Life 
Gottlieb was born on 25 April 1699 in Klosterhäseler, Saxony-Anhalt, the son of Pastor Johann Georg Siegel (1692-1728) and his wife Amanda Helen Elizabeth, daughter of Johann Gottfried Schuchardt, the Auditor of the dragoons . 
He attended the Gymnasium Illustre Augusteum in Weissenfels, returning home in 1714.

In 1717, he moved to the University of Leipzig where he attended lectures by Gottfried Polycarp Müller (1685-1747), Lueder Mencke (1658-1726), Johann Christoph Schacher (1667-1720) and Karl Otto Rechenberg (1689-1751).
For further studies he went to the University of Wittenberg. The teachers at that time included Karl Jakob Spener (1684-1730), Johannes Balthasar Wernher, Heinrich Christoph Berger, Christian Basti Gebhard Neller, Gottfried Ludwig Mencke the Elder and Michael Heinrich Gribner 
In Wittenberg, on 29 June 1719 he acquired the Licentiate of the rights, and on 26 August 1720 he graduated as a Doctor of Law.

In 1734 Siegel was an attorney in Leipzig, Saxony at the Leipzig Consistory (for church matters) and the Oberhofgericht (Saxon Supreme Court). 
On 9 February 1735 he became Professor of feudal law at the Law Faculty of the University of Leipzig, and 1740 he became Counsel of the Leipzig merchants. 
He was general counsel of the University in 1741 and in the winter semester 1753/54 he was president of the Alma Mater.

Siegel married Anna Catharina, daughter of physician Jakob Schmidt, on 19 May 1722 in Klosterhäseler.
He died in 1755 in Leipzig.

Works

 Diss. (Praes. G. L. Menckenio) de rescissione emtiotionis et venditionis ex tunc et ex nunc (vulgo ut vocant). Leipzig 1719
 Diss. de Indossato reconveniendo. Leipzig 1724
 Diss. de fundamento iudicialis pecuniae deposìtionis in Processu cambiali iure Electorali Saxonico admittendae. Leipzig 1725
 Diss. de creditoribus societatis privatis socii creditoribus non praeferendis. Leipzig 1725
 Progr. an servitus confusione exstinctu fundo serviente rursus alienato reviviscat? Leipzig 1725
 Diss. de legitimo successore hereditatem omitiente actionis funerariae reo. Leipzig 1725
 Diss. de iure congrui in Thuringia; vom Gespielde in Thüringen. Leipzig 1726
 Der vorsichtige Wechsel - Gläubiger. Leipzig 1726 
 Diss. de iure pedum: vom Recht der Füsse. Leipzig 1726, 1744
 Diss. de cautione fideicommissorum nomine, praestanda. Leipzig 1728
 Progr. inaug. de litterarum reversalium feudalhim iustitia et nequitate. Leipzig 1735
 Diss. an hypotheca tacita in feudo debito feudali contrahatur? Leipzig 1736
 Diss. prima de litteris feudi reversalibus a simultanee investitis exbibitis; von Lehns - Reversen derer Mitbelehnten. Leipzig 1736, Diss. II. Leipzig 1738
 Diss. de rerum haereditariarum usucapione. Leipzig 1736
 Diss. de testatore suae voluntatis interprete. Leipzig 1737
 Principia iuris feudalis ex iure Imperii, Germanico, Longobardico, atque Electorali Saxonico deprompta, et usui fori accommodata.Leipzig 1738, Editio nova auctior. Leipzig 1746
 Tractatus de litteris investiturarum, von Lehnhbriefen cui varine litterarum investiturarium copiae, variaque praeiudicia novissima in appendice adiecta. Leipzig 1739
 Diss. de arbitrio, ex iuribus Romanis et Germanicis illustrato: von dem Ausspruch derer Schieds – Richter, nach Römisch- und Teutschen Rechten. Leipzig 1739
 Diss. de genuino privilegiorum conceptu. Leipzig 1741
 Diss. de feudo pignoralitio re fundamenti et utilitatis egena: vom Pfand-Lehn, als einer ungegründeten und unnützen Sache. Leipzig 1742
 Corpus iuris cambialis. Leipzig 1742
 Erste Fortfetzung des Corporis iuris cambialis Leipzig 1743
 Diss. de simultanea investitura, sine consensu Vasalli impetrata: von der Mitbelehnschaft, welche ohne des Lehn - Mannes Einwilligung erlanget wird. Leipzig 1743
 Diss. observationes forenses varii argumenti sistens. Leipzig 1745
 Diss. de feudo foemineo proprio. Leipzig 1745
 Diss. de dolo translationem dominii impediente. Leipzig 1748
 Diss. de divisione feudi successionem fimultanee investitorum non restringente. Leipzig 1748
 Diss. exhibens selecta iuris Rigensium cambialis capita explicata, atque observationibus illustrata. Leipzig 1751
 Progr. de iure superficiario reali quidem, ad dominium utile vero haud trahendo. Leipzig 1755
 Diss. de legitima ex feudo petenda. Leipzig 1755
 Progr. de invalida uxoris promissione da iurata SCti Vellejani renunciatione. Leipzig 1754
 Progr. de differentia inter feudum haereditarium in foeminas transitorium et foemineum. Leipzig 1754

References

Further reading
 
 

1699 births
1755 deaths
17th-century German lawyers
People from Burgenlandkreis
Jurists from Saxony-Anhalt